Richard Bland (1710–1776) was an American planter and statesman.

Richard Bland may also refer to:

Richard Bland (burgess) (1665–1720), member of the Virginia House of Burgess
Richard P. Bland (1835–1899), American Democratic Congressman
Richard Bland (golfer) (born 1973), English professional golfer